was a town located in Senboku District, Akita Prefecture, Japan.

In 2003, the town had an estimated population of 10,333 and a density of 61.36 persons per km². The total area was 168.40 km².

On March 22, 2005, Nishisenboku, along with the city of Ōmagari; the towns of Kamioka, Kyōwa, Nakasen, Ōta and Semboku; and the village of Nangai (all from Senboku District), merged to create the city of Daisen.

External links 
  

Dissolved municipalities of Akita Prefecture
Daisen, Akita